Ibrahim Farah (born 24 January 1992) is a Welsh professional footballer who last played as a midfielder for semi-professional football club Carmarthen Town A.F.C. in the Welsh Premier League.

Club career

Cardiff City
Farah is of Somali heritage. Born in the Butetown area of Cardiff, his family moved to the Splott area of the City shortly after he was born where he attended Moorland Primary School. Farah began his career with his home town side Cardiff City, joining their academy at the age of 14, whilst playing for his then local team against Cardiff City Academy who quickly signed him up after impressing. Alongside Nathaniel Jarvis and Alex Evans  he  signed  schoolboy forms at the start of the 2008–09 season. On 23 May 2011, Farah was offered his first professional contract by Cardiff City alongside Alex Evans and Nathaniel Jarvis. Farah has been given the number 32 shirt for the upcoming season. He made his professional debut against Oxford United on 10 August, in the League Cup.

On 24 November 2011, Farah joined Conference National side Tamworth on an emergency loan deal. Cardiff allowed Tamworth to play Farah in the FA Cup and FA Trophy games.

In August 2012, Farah joined Birmingham City on trial with view to a permanent move. He then confirmed he had left Cardiff City. He later confirmed that Cardiff manager Malky Mackay had used racist language during his time at the club.

In August 2014 Farah signed a contract with  Carmarthen Town.

References

External links

1992 births
Living people
Association football midfielders
Footballers from Cardiff
Welsh footballers
Cardiff City F.C. players
Tamworth F.C. players
English Football League players
Carmarthen Town A.F.C. players
Cymru Premier players
Welsh people of Somali descent